The 1899 All England Championships was a badminton tournament held in the Scottish Drill Hall at the London Scottish Rifles Headquarters in Buckingham Gate, Westminster, London, England on 4 April 1899. There were no singles events staged.

Origins
Following the first known open badminton tournament at the Guildford Drill Hall during 1898 the Badminton Association (BA) decided to stage the first All England Championships on 4 April 1899. The one day tournament was at the Drill Hall at the London Scottish Rifles Headquarters in Buckingham Gate and consisted of four courts with the two end courts having balconies over hanging them. The courts were basic very with nets only 16 feet wide, posts with extended canes and chalked lines. The principal event organisers were Mr Richard Fleming St Andrew St John (Honorary Secretary of the BA) and Mr Percy Buckley (Secretary of the Guildford Badminton Association and President of the BA). The winners received two guineas and runner up received one guinea.

Final results

Men's doubles
Fourteen pairs entered. There were two byes and two walk overs in the first round, the latter two because Buckell & Hillier and Mellersh & Collier scratched.

Women's doubles
Thirteen pairs entered. There were three byes in the first round.

Mixed doubles
Twenty five mixed pairs entered.

References

All England Open Badminton Championships
All England
All England Open Badminton Championships in London
All England Championships
All England Badminton Championships
All England Badminton Championships